Norm Matthews (30 August 1915 – 30 December 1985) was a former Australian rules footballer who played with Melbourne and South Melbourne in the Victorian Football League (VFL).

Notes

External links 

1915 births
Australian rules footballers from Victoria (Australia)
Melbourne Football Club players
Sydney Swans players
1985 deaths